Douch is an English-language surname meaning German.

Etymology
Douch is an archaic English orthography of Dutch.

When this orthography was used, Douch (or Dutch) was an English-language adjective synonymous with German sensu lato or Germanic, only acquiring a narrower definition in modern usage as an adjective for the Netherlands.

John Russell Smith, in Patronymica Britannica: a dictionary of the family names of the United Kingdom (1860), writes the following entry for Douch:

DOUCH. An old orthography of 'Dutch,' by which however we must understand, not a Hollander, but a German: the latter word being of rather recent importation into English. The first translation of the whole Bible into our language, by Miles Coverdale, is stated on the title page to have been rendered "out of the Douche (meaning German) and Latyn into Englyshe, 1535." Even so lately as 1660, Howell, in the preface of his Lexicon says, "the root of most of the English language is Dutch," by which of course he means the Teutonic or old German.

The above fact is evident in the common etymological origin of Douch (or Dutch) with the German-language word Deutsch (which means German).

People
Notable people with this surname include:

 Jonny Douch, English bass guitarist in band Clement Marfo & The Frontline
 Kevin Douch, English founder of independent record labels Alcopop! Records and Big Scary Monsters Recording Company 
 Nick Douch, New Zealand drummer in band Ekko Park
 Stuart Douch, English headmaster of Sompting Abbotts Preparatory School

References

External links
 

English-language surnames
Ethnonymic surnames